Roundarch was a privately held company that designed and implemented digital experiences for some of the world's largest organizations. In February 2012, Aegis Group LLC acquired the digital agency. After the acquisition, Roundarch merged with Isobar, Aegis Media's existing creative network, to form Roundarch Isobar. Roundarch delivered websites, rich web applications, mobile applications for the iPhone, iPad applications, Android (operating system) applications, social media applications and digital marketing campaigns for primarily Fortune 500 clients and large government organizations.

History
Roundarch was founded in June 2000 by Deloitte and WPP.  The vision was to create a new specialist consulting firm that combined WPP's creative and marketing capabilities with Deloitte's systems integration capabilities. The result was a company dedicated to building websites and applications that were designed from a user's perspective and were equally elegant in their use of technology. Roundarch had offices in Boston, Chicago, Denver and New York. Roundarch was a privately owned company, operated by its senior management until February 2012 when Aegis Group plc acquired the digital agency. After the acquisition, Roundarch merged with Isobar, Aegis Media's existing creative network, to form Roundarch Isobar.

Sample projects 
Roundarch's clients represented a broad base of industries from media, energy, financial services, government, healthcare, manufacturing, food & beverage, retail and transportation.

Major clients included the U.S. Air Force, Avis Budget Group, HBO, Bloomberg Sports, New York Jets, Waters Corporation, Tesla Motors, The Hershey Company, A&E Network, Crowley Maritime and the U.S. Army.

New York Jets Touchscreen Command Center 
In 2010, Roundarch was selected by the New York Jets NFL Team to produce a touchscreen command center that provides real-time stadium and game data, allowing the New York Jets owner, Woody Johnson, to monitor fan experience and make important operational decisions during game time.

Bloomberg Sports 
Decision Maker
In 2010, Bloomberg Sports partnered with Roundarch to design and develop the iPad and iPhone applications for its fantasy football tool Decision Maker. Decision Maker gives mobile users an edge in their fantasy football leagues with applications that deliver the power of Bloomberg's statistical analytics in a fan-centric, intuitive and visually rich format

Front office
In 2011, Bloomberg again partnered with Roundarch to create two iOS applications that help fantasy players and baseball fans alike by providing real time, customized analysis of every Major League Baseball player. The Front Office Draft Kit® for both the iPad iPad and iPhone iPhone are extensions of the newly redesigned web application for 2011 and bring key features of the Front Office 2011 product and Bloomberg's Analytics to the expanding iOS audience through smaller more portable form factors.  While the functionality is consistent through both applications, each is tailored to maximize the unique form factors of each device.   This includes individual player statistics, proprietary projections and player outlooks for the 2011 season, as well as player lists which can be filtered by various positional or performance factors.

Avis Budget Group 
In 2009, Roundarch announced the recreation of the online experience for Avis Rent-a-Car. In addition to redesigning the Avis Rent a Car System website, Roundarch developed a free iPhone application that enables Avis customers to book car rentals through their iPhone. Roundarch also created an e-commerce widget called a “Site Extension” that expands AVIS’ online presence by embedding the Avis rental booking function on a partner's website, all on a single page.

ClubCorp 
In 2010, ClubCorp, the world leader in private clubs, partnered with Roundarch to overhaul the online offering and its individual affiliate club sites.  ClubCorp redesigned their sites to improve their business at a time when memberships and time spent at private clubs have been in continuous decline.  The new online experience launched late in 2010, provides a richer web experience for the clubs, their members, and event planners.

Crowley Maritime Corporation 
In 2010, Crowley Maritime Corporation, one of the world's largest privately held marine solutions, transportation and logistics companies, has partnered with Roundarch, to develop a new web presence that organizes content around a highly intuitive, solutions-based navigation for its family of websites, including the following websites: Crowley,  TITAN Salvage, Jensen Maritime, and Customized Brokers. 

Roundarch and Crowley Maritime Corporation were awarded a 2011 TMSA Compass Award.

Herff Jones / Nystrom 
In 2009, Roundarch worked in partnership with Herff Jones / Nystrom to develop StrataLogica, a digital product that delivers all Nystrom wall maps and globes in a 3-D environment using the Google Maps API Premier platform, including the Google Earth API.

Merapi Open-Source Software 
In April 2009, Roundarch announced its participation in designing the Tesla Model S prototype sedan's touch-screen control panel to coincide with the release of its open-source software, Merapi. Merapi, primarily developed by Roundarch, serves as a messaging bridge between applications that run in the Adobe Flash player, or Adobe AIR, and applications written in Java.

References

Defunct companies based in Chicago
Companies established in 2000